Anne Matta (born Anne Grousbeck; February 5, 1966, in Miami, Florida) is an American former professional tennis player.

A three-time All-American at the University of Texas, Grousbeck competed on the professional tour after graduating in 1988. She featured on the tour until 1991, making the most impact as a doubles player, with a best doubles ranking of 100 in the world. In the 1990 season featured in the main draw of the women's doubles at the Australian Open, French Open and Wimbledon.

Grousbeck is married to Chilean tennis player Horacio Matta. She is the daughter of Massachusetts entrepreneur H. Irving Grousbeck and her brother, Wyc Grousbeck, is the lead owner of the Boston Celtics.

ITF finals

Singles: 1 (0–1)

Doubles: 7 (2–5)

References

External links
 
 

1966 births
Living people
American female tennis players
Tennis people from Massachusetts
Texas Longhorns women's tennis players